The Polish Academy Award for Best Film Director is an annual award given to the best Polish film director of the year.

Winners and nominees

1990s

2000s

2010s

2020s

Multiple wins and nominations

Multiple wins

Three or more nominations

References

External links
 Polish Film Awards; Official website 
 Laureates at Internet Movie Database

Awards for best director
Polish film awards
Awards established in 1999
1999 establishments in Poland